Northern moonwort is a common name for several ferns and may refer to:

Botrychium boreale
Botrychium pinnatum, native to North America